Experiment Alcatraz is a 1950 American crime film directed by Edward L. Cahn and written by Orville H. Hampton. The film stars John Howard, Joan Dixon, Walter Kingsford and Robert Shayne. The film was released on November 21, 1950, by RKO Pictures.

Plot
A number of Alcatraz prisoners have volunteered to take an experimental serum that could cure a fatal blood disease, promised a parole if they take part. During the experiments, notorious racketeer Barry Morgan steals one of lieutenant nurse Joan McKenna's scissors and stabs convict Eddie Ganz to death, then escapes.

The medical tests are abandoned, the vaccine called a failure. Joan is upset for many reasons, including that such a serum could help her brother Dick, who has the disease. Dr. Ross Williams created the medicine and he attempts, with Joan's help, to understand why Morgan behaved the way he did. Ross is beaten by one of Morgan's thugs, Duke Shaw, and told that he and Joan had better drop their pursuit, but they don't.

The trail leads them to Lake Tahoe and a lodge owner, Ethel Ganz, the dead inmate's stepdaughter. She pulls a gun on them. It turns out Eddie hid $250,000 in stolen loot that she found. Ethel is now married to Morgan, with whom she plotted the murder and prison breakout. Morgan turns up with a gun, putting the lives of Ross and Joan in peril, but she is rescued, the villains are incarcerated and the serum is put to good use.

Cast 
John Howard as Dr. Ross Williams
Joan Dixon as Lt. Joan McKenna
Walter Kingsford as Dr. J.P. Finley
Lynne Carter as Ethel Ganz
Robert Shayne as Barry Morgan
Kim Spalding as Duke Shaw
Sam Scar as Eddie Ganz
Kenneth MacDonald as Col. Harris
Dick Cogan as Dan Staley
Frank Cady as Max Henry
Byron Foulger as Jim Carlton 
Ralph Peters as Bartender
Lewis Martin as Asst. District Attorney Walton 
Harry Lauter as Richard 'Dick' McKenna
Raymond Largay as Warden Keaton

References

External links 
 

1950 films
American black-and-white films
1950s English-language films
RKO Pictures films
Films directed by Edward L. Cahn
1950 crime films
American crime films
1950s American films